The transposed Paternò−Büchi reaction involves a ππ* excited state of alkene reacting with a ground state carbonyl functionality. This is reversal of the traditional Paternò−Büchi reaction where an excited carbonyl group reacts with a ground state alkene. This strategy was first reported by Sivaguru and co-workers with reaction of enamides.

References

Organic reactions